is a Japanese actress, the widow of Yūsaku Matsuda, and the sister of Mami Kumagai. 

At the age of 17 she appeared in a television series, Tantei Monogatari, starring Yūsaku Matsuda, who was then married. They started a relationship and, after Masuda divorced his first wife, Michiko, they married in 1983. Their son Ryuhei Matsuda was born that year. They had two more children: a second son, Shota Matsuda, born in 1985, and a daughter, Yūki Matsuda, born in 1988.

She appeared as Ryo Ishibashi's dead wife in the movie Audition (1999). In 2009 she was the executive producer for the documentary Soul Red: Yusaku Matsuda about her husband's life and death.

In 2008, she published a book of photographs of the model Hitomi Katayama, Watakushi no suki na kodoku.

Filmography

Film
Kindaichi Kosuke no Boken (1979) (as Miyuki Kumagai)
Elephant Song (1994)
Genki no Kamisama  (1997)
Nodo Jiman (1998)
Rebirth of Mothra III (1998)
Yomigaeru yusaku: Tantei monogatari tokubetsu hen  (1999)
Ano natsu no hi (1999)
Audition (1999) as Ryoko Aoyama
Kuroe (2001)
Pakodate-jin (2002)
Boutaoshi! (2003)
Riyu (2004)
Zoo (2005)
Sekai wa tokidoki utsukushii (2007)
Tokyo Tower: Mom and Me, and Sometimes Dad (2007)
Hannin ni tsugu (2007)
Shibuya (2010)
Made in Japan: Kora! (2011)
Still the Water (2014)
Hot Road (2014)
Love & Peace (2015)
Chihayafuru Part 1 (2016) as Taeko Miyauchi
Chihayafuru Part 2 (2016) as Taeko Miyauchi
Chihayafuru Part 3 (2018) as Taeko Miyauchi
Blind Witness (2019)

Television
 Tokyo Vice (2022)

References

External links

1961 births
Japanese film actresses
Japanese photographers
Japanese women photographers
Living people
People from Tokyo